The L-series engine is an automotive diesel engine built by Powertrain Ltd, a sister company of MG Rover.

History
The L-series engine commenced production on 28 November 1994 and was the first Rover designed and manufactured direct injection Diesel for use in Rover Cars applications and derived from the established Rover MDi / Perkins Prima engine (Perkins BA / Perkins 4.20 naturally aspirated and Perkins BB / Perkins T4.20 turbocharged) used in the Austin Montego, Austin Maestro, and Leyland Sherpa van sold by 'Freight Rover' in the '80s, later by LDV.

The engine started production in low volume at Longbridge for Rover 600 only at first with later higher volume production at Solihull for all other applications.

The L-series was extremely versatile and has been fitted in the Land Rover Freelander, Rover 200 Mk3, Rover 400 Mk2, Rover 600, and European versions of the Honda Accord and Honda Civic. It has been successfully tuned to produce much higher power than standard.

A development of the L-series engine (G series) featuring a modern common rail fuel injection system was underway when MG-Rover ceased production, but the company's closure prevented it from being fully developed and released.

Technology
There are several forms of this engine.

The first is a non intercooled, mechanically controlled fuel-injection system. This version is available in Rover 200 and Rover 400 models and the model designation ends in "D", i.e. SD, SLD etc., etc.

The second is intercooled and has an electronically controlled fuel-injection system. This version is available in Rover 200, Rover 400 and Rover 600 models. The model designation ends in "Di", i.e. SDi, SLDi etc., etc.

The last and most recent engine is intercooled and also has an electronically controlled injection system which is slightly more advanced and produces more torque but the same power output as earlier intercooled models. This is the version that is used in the Rover 25, Rover 45, MG ZR, and MG ZS.

All versions use Bosch fuel-injection equipment of various designs. An unusual feature is that the injector pump is driven by a toothed belt from the 'rear' end of the overhead camshaft, itself driven at the 'front' end by another toothed belt connected to the crankshaft.

The engine is extremely environmentally friendly in terms of its emissions. It is quiet in operation owing to its two-stage fuel injection & ECU controlling fuel for most models and timing for them all. The engine currently satisfies ECD III derogated Diesel emissions legislation when installed with an appropriate specified oxidation catalyst.

Sensors around the engine constantly give feedback to the ECU regarding injection timing, engine speed, load, fuel and coolant temperature, boost pressure etc. to ensure that optimum running conditions are maintained.

The basic engine is a conventional 4-cylinder with 2 valves per cylinder operated by a single overhead camshaft and hydraulic tappets.

The block is made of cast iron with aluminum alloy cylinder head and sump. An AlliedSignal GT15 turbocharger supplies boosted air. A fully modulated, either air- or water-cooled exhaust gas recirculation (EGR) system is incorporated into the intake/exhaust system.

All accessories (PAS, aircon, water pump, vacuum pump, alternator) are all driven off a single poly-vee-belt drive with autotensioner. Camshaft and injection pump drives are via two multi-toothed belts with either automatic or manual tensioners.

Related development
The Land Rover Td5 engine, a 2.5-litre, 5-cylinder turbodiesel used in the Discovery and the Defender had the same bore/stroke dimensions as the L series and used the same pistons, connecting rods and crankshaft dimensions. However, the Td5 was not simply a 5-cylinder L series. It used Lucas electronic unit injection, instead of the L series' direct-injection system, as well as a through-flow cylinder head and a very different ancillary equipment layout. The Td5 had been developed by the Rover Group under the codename 'Project Storm', which was originally to develop a replacement range of turbodiesels to replace the L series, with 4-, 5-, and 6-cylinder engines of 2, 2.5, and 3 litres respectively. When the Rover Group was taken over by BMW, they brought their own range of diesels which rendered the 2-litre and 3-litre Storm engines unnecessary. Only the Td5 entered production as this was the only diesel engine of the BMW or Rover Group that would fit (engine length) in Discovery and Defender with sufficient power output and had the then up-to-date direct-injection system.

Specifications
The L-series engine has been available in a number of power specifications:

 Turbo/Non-intercooled (ceased production in 2000)
 Turbo/intercooled (Torque:  at 2000 rpm.) 
 Turbo/intercooled 
 Turbo/intercooled (in later cars)
 Turbo/intercooled (in later cars)

General
Firing order – 1-3-4-2
Boost pressure – 
Fuel pressure –  maxv

L
Diesel engines by model
Straight-four engines